Paul Derbyshire (born 3 November 1986) is an Italian rugby union player. Derbyshire, who is a flanker, plays club rugby for Mogliano in Top12.

Derbyshire joined Benetton Treviso from Petrarca in June 2010 for their first season in the Celtic League.
He played with Treviso until 2015. In 2015–16 Pro12 season, he played for Zebre.

He made his debut for Italy against Australia on 13 June 2009.

References

It's Rugby Profile

1986 births
Living people
People from Cecina, Tuscany
Italian rugby union players
Rugby union flankers
Benetton Rugby players
Stade Français players
Italy international rugby union players
Sportspeople from the Province of Livorno